Štefan Horný (born 13 January 1957) is a former Slovak football player and recently manager of MFK Skalica. He also managed a FK DAC 1904 Dunajská Streda.

Honours

Manager
MFK Skalica
DOXXbet liga: Runners-Up: 2014–15 (Promoted)
3. liga: Runners-Up: 2013-14 (Promoted)

References

1957 births
People from Senica District
Sportspeople from the Trnava Region
Living people
Slovak footballers
Association football midfielders
FC Zbrojovka Brno players
Dukla Prague footballers
ŠK Slovan Bratislava players
Slovak football managers
Slovak Super Liga managers
FK Dukla Banská Bystrica managers
1. FC Tatran Prešov managers
FC DAC 1904 Dunajská Streda managers
FC Petržalka managers
FC ViOn Zlaté Moravce managers